Sun Xing (born October 16, 1963) is a Hong Kong actor and Mandopop singer born in Guangzhou, China. He shot to fame in the 1990s by portraying heroes in a number of Taiwanese wuxia TV dramas. Later he mostly appeared in comedies.

Biography
Sun Xing was born in Guangzhou, Guangdong, China to a Malaysian Chinese father and a Chinese mother. He grew up in Beijing and immigrated to Hong Kong with his parents as a teenager. He started his acting career in Hong Kong, and moved to Taiwan in the 1990s where he shot to fame through a number of popular TV series.

Selected filmography

Films

Television

Discography

Album

Other songs

Scandal
Sun was arrested by the police in Beijing on April 22, 2011 for taking illegal drugs. He served 19 days in detention.

References

External links

20th-century Hong Kong male actors
21st-century Hong Kong male actors
Hong Kong male television actors
Hong Kong male film actors
Male actors from Guangdong
1963 births
Living people
Male actors from Guangzhou
Hong Kong Mandopop singers
20th-century Hong Kong male singers
Hong Kong people of Malaysian descent
Chinese male film actors
Chinese male television actors
Chinese people of Malaysian descent
21st-century Hong Kong male singers